The LSWR P14 class was a class of 4-6-0 locomotive designed by Dugald Drummond for the London and South Western Railway.

Background 

The continuing need to grasp the nettle in terms of Drummond's first two 4-6-0 classes meant that he went back to the drawing board to create another design.  The LSWR's immediate traffic needs were covered by the relatively successful G14 design of 1908, though with only five locomotives in the class, they were unable to undertake the haulage of all heavy boat train services.  However, the problem of continually accelerating timetables to the South Coast ports remained, and the G14s were in dire need of assistance from a new class of similar design.

The design's proven ability to ply their trade at faster speeds, and their inherent larger power-to-weight ratio on other lines meant that Drummond once again decided to persevere with the concept.

Construction history 

On his penultimate 4-6-0 design, Drummond had to produce a locomotive that was capable of hauling increased traffic at speed.  Once again, the possible advantages of the design presented themselves. A similar boiler to the other classes, rated to 175 lbf/in² saturated steam pressure, was utilised, therefore generating the steam needed to power a four-cylinder front end, which powered 6 ft wheels. The new design was equipped with four sets of Walschaerts valve gear, therefore reducing the mechanical complexity that had plagued his previous designs. This factor also meant a marginally lighter axle-loading.  Large, single splashers were also implemented which covered the wheels, though these would prove troublesome in service. The Drummond 'watercart' eight-wheeled tender was utilised for the long journeys on the LSWR mainline.  Full-scale construction was undertaken at Nine Elms, with the first of five P14s being outshopped in 1910, two years after the completion of his G14 design.

Rebuilding under Maunsell

After a period of 15 years in both primary and secondary passenger duties, Richard Maunsell, who became Chief Mechanical Engineer of the newly formed Southern Railway in 1923, decided that the class needed to be rebuilt to conform with the general standardization of Southern locomotive classes. The P14s were reduced to kits of parts, which were utilised in creating a further batch of N15 (King Arthur Class) locomotives. However 0449 (renumbered to make way for the new N15) ran for several months, as part of the development work for the Lord Nelsons, at the same time of its alleged rebuild as the new N15 449 was running in.

Livery and numbering 

Under the LSWR, the P14s were outshopped in the LSWR Passenger Sage Green livery with purple-brown edging, creating panels of green. This was further lined in white and black with 'LSWR' in gilt on the tender tank sides.

When transferred to Southern Railway ownership after 1923, the locomotives were outshopped in Richard Maunsell's darker version of the LSWR livery.  The LSWR standard gilt lettering was changed to yellow with 'Southern' on the water tank sides.  The locomotives also featured black and white lining.

Operational details 

The P14 design had originally been intended to operate expresses between Salisbury and Exeter, replacing the failed F13 and E14 predecessors.  They were considered to be more successful than these locomotives by their crews, and acted as supplements to their G14 class siblings on these duties.  However, the class still had most of the drawbacks associated with Drummond 4-6-0s in terms of high water and coal consumption.

The P14s continued in their Drummond guise without modification until they were rebuilt in 1925 by Richard Maunsell, who used the parts to create a new batch of N15 locomotives. As a result, no examples survived into preservation.

References 

P14
4-6-0 locomotives
Railway locomotives introduced in 1910
Standard gauge steam locomotives of Great Britain